This page details the honours and statistics of individual players of the Crusaders Rugby League club.

2011 Squad

2010 Squad

Player Of The Year

The award is determined by fans votes and is usually presented in December or January.

Award Honours

Welsh Internationals

A total of 18 players have won caps with the Wales national rugby league team whilst playing for the Crusaders.

Other Internationals

 Anthony Seibold - Germany
 Jason Chan - Papua New Guinea

References

 
Crusaders